Five Finger Death Punch, also abbreviated as 5FDP or FFDP, is an American heavy metal band from Las Vegas, Nevada, formed in 2005. The band originally consisted of vocalist and keyboardist Ivan Moody, rhythm guitarist Zoltan Bathory, lead guitarist Caleb Andrew Bingham, bassist Matt Snell, and drummer Jeremy Spencer. Bingham was replaced by guitarist Darrell Roberts in 2006, who was then replaced by Jason Hook in 2009. Bassist Matt Snell departed from the band in 2010, and was replaced by Chris Kael in 2011. Spencer then departed the band in 2018 due to recurring back issues, and was replaced by Charlie Engen, making rhythm guitarist Bathory the only remaining founding member of the band. In October 2020, British guitarist Andy James became the band's lead guitarist, replacing Jason Hook.

Five Finger Death Punch's debut album The Way of the Fist was released in 2007, which began achieving rapid success and selling over 500,000 copies in the United States. The 2009 follow-up album War Is the Answer further increased their popularity, selling over 1,000,000 copies and got certified Platinum by the RIAA, the band's third album, American Capitalist, was released on October 11, 2011, and achieved Platinum status. The following four albums—The Wrong Side of Heaven and the Righteous Side of Hell, Volume 1 (2013), The Wrong Side of Heaven and the Righteous Side of Hell, Volume 2 (2013), Got Your Six (2015), and And Justice for None (2018)—have all been certified Platinum and Gold, making Five Finger Death Punch one of the most successful heavy metal bands of the decade. The band has played international music festivals including Mayhem Festival in 2008, 2010, and 2013, and Download Festival in 2009, 2010, 2013, 2015, and 2017. The band released their eighth studio album, F8, in 2020 and their ninth album AfterLife was released in 2022.

Five Finger Death Punch are the recipients of the RadioContraband Rock Radio Awards for "Indie Artist of the Year" in 2011, 2012, 2013, and 2014. They were also honored with the Radio Contraband Rock Radio Award for Album (American Capitalist) and Song of the Year ("Coming Down") in 2012 and "Video of the Year" for "Wrong Side of Heaven" in 2014.

To date, Five Finger Death Punch has released nine studio albums, one live album, two compilation albums, one extended play (EP), and 33 singles.

History

Formation, departure of Bingham, and The Way of the Fist (2005–2009)

Five Finger Death Punch was founded in 2005 by former U.P.O. bassist Zoltan Bathory and drummer Jeremy Spencer, Zoltan deriving the band's name from classic martial arts cinema. Bassist Matt Snell joined in early 2006. Later that year, Bathory contacted former Motograter vocalist Ivan Moody, sending him some of the material the band had recorded and asked him to audition for the vocalist position. Moody flew from his home in Denver, Colorado to Los Angeles and quickly began recording material with the band.

By the end of 2006, their debut album, The Way of the Fist had been recorded and entirely self-produced. The album was recorded with Stevo "Shotgun" Bruno and Mike Sarkisyan and was mixed by guitarist Logan Mader. After searching for a second guitarist, they found Caleb Bingham who played some shows with the band, but was later replaced by Darrell Roberts. Shortly after recording the album, they signed a record deal with Firm Music, a branch of "The Firm". On July 10, 2007, they released an EP, Pre-Emptive Strike exclusively through the American iTunes Store. The album's lead single, "The Bleeding", was released on July 13, 2007. The Way of the Fist was released on July 31, 2007.  The album entered the Billboard 200 at number 199 and was certified gold in 2011.

From July 30 – September 2, 2007, the band went on their first major tour cycle as one of the supporting acts on Korn's Family Values Tour. They were also a supporting act of the North American leg of Korn's Bitch We Have a Problem Tour from September 22 – October 27, 2007. They were set to tour with Chimaira and All That Remains from January through March 2008, but due to singer Moody developing cysts on his vocal cords they were forced to pull out. He made a full recovery and they began to tour again. They supported Disturbed on their Indestructible US Tour from April through May 2008.

The Way of the Fist was re-released on May 13, 2008, with 3 bonus tracks. One of the bonus tracks, "Never Enough" was released as the album's second single on July 15, 2008. Later that year they were a part of the 2008 Mayhem Festival playing the Jägermeister Stage. The third single from The Way of the Fist, "Stranger Than Fiction" was released on September 17, 2008. The Way of the Fist was released through Spinefarm Records in Canada on November 4, 2008, and in Europe on January 19, 2009. In January 2009, Darrell Roberts was rumored to have been fired; the split was confirmed a few days later, and Roberts was replaced by guitarist Jason Hook. They ended their support for their first album playing the main stage at the 2009 Download Festival.

Departure of Roberts and War Is the Answer (2009–2010)

In May 2009, Five Finger Death Punch announced their second studio album, War Is the Answer. The album was produced by Kevin Churko and mixed by Randy Staub. The album debuted at number 7 on the Billboard 200 and has been certified platinum by the RIAA. The first single from the album, "Hard to See", was released on July 21, 2009. To promote War Is the Answer, Five Finger Death Punch embarked on "The Shock and Raw" US Tour. Main support on the tour was provided by Shadows Fall, with additional support coming from Otep and 2Cents. Upon completing the US run of the tour, Five Finger Death Punch then brought the Shock and Raw tour to Europe, finishing off with a run of dates in the UK. Main support for these dates was again Shadows Fall, and opening acts for the UK portion of the tour were Rise To Remain and Magnacult.

The second single from War Is the Answer, "Walk Away", was released on November 2, 2009. The album also spawned two UK-only singles, "Dying Breed", released on November 16, 2009, and "No One Gets Left Behind", released on March 8, 2010. During March 2010, Five Finger Death Punch traveled to Iraq and played 10 shows for the United States troops. The band's cover of Bad Company's self-titled song was released as the fifth single from War Is the Answer on May 17, 2010. On their way to perform at Rock am Ring and Rock im Park Zoltan Bathory, Matt Snell and Jeremy Spencer were detained by German police for alleged international weapons violations. After recognizing the event as a misunderstanding, German police released the band members and they appeared at both Rock im Park on June 4, 2010, and Rock am Ring June 6, 2010, as scheduled.

Five Finger Death Punch also played the Maurice Jones Main Stage at the 2010 Download Festival on June 12, 2010. While playing the song "Dying Breed", their set was cut due to too many people crowd surfing up to the stage. They were allowed to play one final song, "The Bleeding". They played the main stage at Mayhem Festival 2010 with Korn, Rob Zombie and Lamb of God from July 10 until August 14, 2010. On August 17, 2010, they performed the songs "Bad Company" and "Hard to See" on the ABC show Jimmy Kimmel Live!. On September 16, 2010, The band released "Far from Home" as the sixth single from War Is the Answer. They supported Godsmack on their "The Oracle 2010" tour from October 3 – November 4, 2010. The song, "Dying Breed" was featured on the soundtrack for Namco Bandai Games' remake of Splatterhouse, released on November 23, 2010.

Departure of Snell and American Capitalist (2010–2012)

The band began to record their third studio album in November 2010 at The Hideout studios in Las Vegas, Nevada. Bassist Matt Snell departed from the band in December 2010, and in June 2011, Chris Kael was announced as Snell's replacement. The band's third album, titled American Capitalist, was released October 11, 2011. Production for the album was handled again by Kevin Churko. The first single from American Capitalist, entitled "Under and Over It", was released on July 27, 2011, following a music video in September 2011. In support of the album, Five Finger Death Punch embarked on their "Share the Welt" tour from October 16 – December 14, 2011 with support from All That Remains, Hatebreed and Rains and their "Furious and Deadly" tour from March 23 – April 12, 2012 with support from Soulfly, Windowpane, and Persist. The song "Back for More" is included on the soundtrack for the video game Madden NFL 12. "Back for More" was released as a digital single on September 13, 2011. "Remember Everything" was released as the second official single for American Capitalist in November 2011, with a music video following in February 2012.  "Coming Down" was released as the third official single from American Capitalist in April 2012, with a music video, directed by Nick Peterson, following in June 2012. The song also won the band an Independent Music Award in 2013 for Best Metal/Hardcore Song.

From July 13 to August 28, 2012, Five Finger Death Punch took part in Metal Hammer's "Trespass America Festival" with support from Battlecross, God Forbid, Emmure, Pop Evil, Trivium and Killswitch Engage.

The Wrong Side of Heaven and the Righteous Side of Hell (2013–2014)

On February 28, the band posted a picture on Facebook of Moody recording vocals for the album. On March 12, an update video was posted to YouTube. On March 18, the band was announced to be playing Mayhem Festival 2013. On March 18, Five Finger Death Punch posted a promotional video for their next tour with a new song "Here to Die". The band also announced that they were working on a fourth album, due in the summer.

On May 1, 2013, the band announced the release of their next two studio albums collectively titled The Wrong Side of Heaven and the Righteous Side of Hell with Volume 1 being released on July 30, and Volume 2 following on November 19. During the fifth annual Golden Gods Awards, Five Finger Death Punch performed a new song with Rob Halford of Judas Priest entitled "Lift Me Up". The song was released as a single on May 14.

On June 6, Five Finger Death Punch revealed the artwork for The Wrong Side of Heaven and the Righteous Side of Hell, Volume 1 and also released a snippet of future single "Dot Your Eyes"  Volume 1 reached the No. 2 position on the Billboard 200 with 113,000 copies sold in its first week, making it the band's most successful debut to date. The Wrong Side of Heaven and the Righteous Side of Hell Volume 1 has sold over 210,000 copies .

On September 9, 2013, the band released a new single, "Battle Born", in anticipation of their fifth studio album The Wrong Side of Heaven and the Righteous Side of Hell, Volume 2. It sold 77,000 copies in its first week, and once again landed in the No. 2 position on the Billboard 200.

On August 11, 2014, Five Finger Death Punch released a video for the song "Wrong Side of Heaven". The video is about homeless veterans who have post-traumatic stress disorder, traumatic brain injury, and depression after serving in the military, and not receiving the help they need for their illnesses.

Got Your Six (2015–2016)

On December 12, 2013, Five Finger Death Punch revealed in a radio interview that they had already begun working on a sixth studio album. On January 14, 2015, Five Finger Death Punch announced US Spring headline tour dates from April 25 to May 9, 2015, and their intention to enter the studio to write and record a new album. On May 2, 2015, the band released the title of their sixth album, Got Your Six as well as a teaser for a new song titled "Ain't My Last Dance" on their official Facebook page. The album, which was slated for release on August 28, 2015, was later pushed back to September 4. On May 19, 2015, the band announced a co-headlining North American Tour with Papa Roach to promote the upcoming album and were accompanied by In This Moment as special guests with support by From Ashes to New for the tour. The band also performed on the main stage as part of Download Festival 2015.

A Decade of Destruction, And Justice for None, and departure of Spencer (2016–2019) 

On April 27, 2016, Billboard reported that Five Finger Death Punch's record label Prospect Park had filed a lawsuit against the band on April 21, 2016, for breaching their contract. The basis of the claim cites that the band began working on a new album without Prospect Park's consent and will be working with Rise Records. In a recent interview, vocalist Ivan Moody has said he will be completing the current tour and leave the band at the end of 2017. The next day however, an announcement was published on the official site of FFDP, where it was revealed, that rumors about Ivan's departure are false. According to the announcement, the vocalist plans to start a side project beside Five Finger Death Punch, which does not mean he has plans on leaving.

However, during a concert in the Netherlands, Moody did not show up to perform the first song, which was sung by Tommy Vext, with Moody saying he was running "a little bit late". Vext also sang a second song during the set later in the evening while Moody walked off stage. During the show all of the members left the stage for long periods on several occasions, and Hook also threw his guitar down and walked offstage at one point. During the set, Moody said that "there is no other singer for Five Finger Death Punch", and then later said "This is my last show with Five Finger Death Punch" before making a slit-throat gesture. Bathory shortly after the show tweeted that the events that transpired were "not a publicity stunt."

The day after the show in Tilburg, Netherlands, the band announced a headline European tour with In Flames and Of Mice & Men in late 2017. Later that same day, the band released a statement addressing what happened at the show via their Facebook page, stating that bands that tour as heavily as they do will "inevitably have a few derailments, but the train always keeps on moving", implying that all shows would proceed as planned and that Moody would remain as the band's frontman. Ivan Moody subsequently checked himself into rehab and sat out the remainder of the tour. Tommy Vext filled in for Moody while he sought treatment. On August 19, Ivan Moody returned to the stage at the Illinois State Fair, although just days prior it was still unknown if he would be taking the stage.

In December 2017, it was announced that the band was working on their seventh studio album. The album, And Justice for None was released May 18, 2018. On December 21, 2017, the band released a video for their cover of "Gone Away" by The Offspring. The cover song was featured on Five Finger Death Punch's greatest hits album, A Decade of Destruction. On April 5, 2018, the band released "Fake" as the lead single from And Justice for None. On April 20, 2018, a second single was released, titled "Sham Pain". A third single "When the Seasons Change" was released on May 4, 2018.

For a Fall 2018 tour with Breaking Benjamin, Charlie Engen replaced Jeremy Spencer to allow him to undergo back surgery. On December 18, it was announced that Spencer had departed the band permanently. In June 2019, it was announced that Jeremy Spencer has continued the band's support of first responders and was sworn in as a reserve police officer in Indiana.

Five Finger Death Punch have also worked with Brantley Gilbert, Brian May of Queen, and Kenny Wayne Shepherd to re-record a new version of Sheperd's song "Blue on Black". The proceeds from the recording support The Gary Sinise Foundation. While a cover of the song had already appeared on And Justice for None, this new version merged Sheperd's blues rock, Gilbert's country, May's classic rock and Five Finger Death Punch's mainstream rock styles.

F8, departure of Hook, and A Decade of Destruction: Volume 2 (2019–2021)

On May 9, 2019, the band released a video announcing a "new record in the making". The album, F8 was released on February 28, 2020. The album's lead single, "Inside Out", was released on December 2, 2019. "A Little Bit Off" was released as the second single in June 2020. Both songs topped the Billboard Mainstream Rock songs. On February 4, 2020, it was announced that lead guitarist Jason Hook was forced to miss the remaining shows of the European tour due to health issues. Andy James was named as substitute lead guitarist for the rest of the tour. It was confirmed on October 12, 2020, that Hook officially left the band, with James replacing him permanently.

AfterLife (2021–present)
In May 2021, it was announced that the band planned on recording their ninth album in 2022. They will also make a 15th anniversary re-recording of their debut album, The Way of the Fist. On April 12, 2022, the band released the title track from their ninth studio album, AfterLife. On the same day, the band announced a U.S. tour with Megadeth, The Hu, and Fire from the Gods, set for August through October 2022. On May 13, 2022, the band released the second single, "IOU". They also announced the release of their ninth studio album, AfterLife, which was released on August 19, 2022. On June 9, 2022, the band released the third single, "Welcome to the Circus". On July 8, 2022, the band released the fourth single, "Times Like These".

In October 2022, Moody announced plans to retire from heavy metal music after releasing the band's tenth studio album to spend more time with his kids. Moody later retracted his retirement announcement stating:

The band subsequently toured across the United States at the end of 2022 with country rock artists Brantley Gilbert and Cory Marks serving as the opening acts.

Musical style and influences

Five Finger Death Punch's musical style has generally been regarded as heavy metal, groove metal, alternative metal, hard rock, thrash metal, nu metal, and arena rock. Thom Jurek of AllMusic wrote that Five Finger Death Punch's "instantly recognizable sound is  equal parts melodic and meaty guitar riffs, fat vamps, catchy hooks, tight, flashy solos, and hard-grooving bass and drums". Bathory described Five Finger Death Punch as "a straight-up heavy metal band with a hint of thrash metal—maybe a hint of the Euro stuff in there" and then said, "that's pretty much what we are". Five Finger Death Punch vocalist Ivan Moody's vocals are usually singing and screaming. The band has released successful ballads as well.

Bathory cited Pantera, Voivod, Iron Maiden, Accept, W.A.S.P., and Yngwie Malmsteen as influences. Ivan Moody cited vocalists such as Mike Patton, Phil Anselmo, Layne Staley and Lynn Strait as influences. Moody credited the witty lyricism of Tool's Maynard James Keenan and Faith No More's Mike Patton as great inspirations. The singer also said, "Pantera is one of our biggest influences". Jeremy Spencer cited drummers such as Lars Ulrich, Dave Lombardo, Gene Hoglan, Dave Grohl, Buddy Rich and Tommy Aldridge as influences. Spencer also cited Prince and David Bowie as influences.

Band members

Current members
 Zoltan Bathory – rhythm guitar ; lead guitar, bass 
 Ivan Moody – lead vocals, keyboards 
 Chris Kael – bass, backing vocals 
 Charlie Engen – drums 
 Andy James – lead guitar, backing vocals 

Former members
 Caleb Andrew Bingham – lead guitar, backing vocals 
 Darrell Roberts – lead guitar, backing vocals 
 Matt Snell – bass, backing vocals 
 Jeremy Spencer – drums ; lead vocals, keyboards 
 Jason Hook – lead guitar, backing vocals 

Touring musicians
 Philip Labonte – lead vocals 
 Tommy Vext – lead vocals 

Timeline

Discography 

Studio albums
 The Way of the Fist (2007)
 War Is the Answer (2009)
 American Capitalist (2011)
 The Wrong Side of Heaven and the Righteous Side of Hell, Volume 1 (2013)
 The Wrong Side of Heaven and the Righteous Side of Hell, Volume 2 (2013)
 Got Your Six (2015)
 And Justice for None (2018)
 F8 (2020)
 AfterLife (2022)

Awards and nominations 
Revolver Golden Gods Awards

|-
|2012 ||Zoltan Bathory, Jason Hook ||Best Guitarist ||
|-
|2012 ||Ivan Moody ||Best Vocalist || 
|-
|2012 ||Jeremy Spencer ||Best Drummer || 
|-
|2012 || American Capitalist || Album of the Year || 
|-
|2013 || Five Finger Death Punch || Best Live Band || 
|-
|2014 || The Wrong Side of Heaven... || Album of the Year || 
|-
|2014 || Ivan Moody || Best Vocalist || 
|-
|2014 || Zoltan Bathory, Jason Hook || Best Guitarist || 
|-
|2014 || Chris Kael || Best Bassist || 
|-
|2014 || Lift Me Up || Song of the Year || 
|-
|2014 || Five Finger Death Punch || Most Dedicated Fans || 

Metal Hammer Golden Gods Awards

|-
|2009 || Five Finger Death Punch || Best New Band || 
|-
|2010 || Five Finger Death Punch || Best Breakthrough Band || 
|-
|2010 || Zoltan Bathory || Best Shredder || 
|-
|2012 || Five Finger Death Punch || Best International Band || 
|-
|2012 || Zoltan Bathory || Metal As Fuck || 
|-
|2013 || Five Finger Death Punch || Best International Band || 
|-
|2014 || Five Finger Death Punch || Best Live Band || 

Kerrang! Awards

|-
|2009 || Five Finger Death Punch || Best International Newcomer || 

Radio Contraband Rock Radio Awards

|-
|2011 || Five Finger Death Punch || Indie Artist of the Year || 
|-
|2012 || Five Finger Death Punch || Indie Artist of the Year || 
|-
|2012 || American Capitalist || Album of the Year || 
|-
|2012 || Coming Down || Song of the Year || 
|-
|2013 || Five Finger Death Punch || Indie Artist of the Year || 
|-
|2014 || Five Finger Death Punch || Indie Artist of the Year || 
|-
|2014 || Wrong Side of Heaven || Video of the Year || 

Bandit Rock Awards

|-
|2014 || The Wrong Side of Heaven... || Best International Album || 
|-
|2014 || Five Finger Death Punch || Best International Group || 
|-
|2016 || Five Finger Death Punch || Best International Artist || 
|-
|rowspan="2" |2019 || Five Finger Death Punch || Best International Artist || 
|-
|And Justice For None || Best International Album || 

Loudwire Music Awards

|-
|2013 || The Wrong Side of Heaven... || Rock Album of the Year || 
|-
|2013 || Lift Me Up || Rock Song of the Year || 
|-
|2013 || Five Finger Death Punch || Rock Band of the Year || 
|-
|2013 || Five Finger Death Punch || Most Devoted Fans || 
|-
|2013 || Five Finger Death Punch || Best Live Act || 
|-
|2014 || Wrong Side of Heaven || Best Rock Video || 
|-
|2015 || Got Your Six || Best Rock Album || 
|-
|2015 || Wash It All Away || Best Rock Song || 
|-
|2015 || Five Finger Death Punch || Best Rock Band || 
|-
|2015 || Zoltan Bathory, Jason Hook || Best Guitarist || 
|-
|2015 || Jeremy Spencer || Best Drummer || 

SiriusXM Octane Music Awards

|-
|2014 || Five Finger Death Punch || Best Live Band || 
|-
|2015 || Five Finger Death Punch || Artist of the Year || 

iHeartRadio Music Awards

|-
|2016 || Five Finger Death Punch || Rock Artist of the Year || 
|- 
|rowspan="2" |2020 || Five Finger Death Punch || Rock Artist of the Year || 
|- 
| "Blue on Black" || Rock Song of the Year || 
|- 
|rowspan="2" |2022 || "Living the Dream" || Rock Song of the Year || 
|- 
| Five Finger Death Punch || Rock Artist of the Year ||

References

External links 

 
 Five Finger Death Punch on Doligo Music

American alternative metal musical groups
Heavy metal musical groups from Nevada
2005 establishments in Nevada
American hard rock musical groups
Musical groups from Las Vegas
Rock music groups from Nevada
American groove metal musical groups
Musical groups established in 2005
Musical quintets